Morronea is a genus of flowering plants belonging to the family Poaceae.

Its native range is Mexico to Tropical America.

Species:

Morronea arundinariae 
Morronea cayoensis 
Morronea guatemalensis 
Morronea incumbens 
Morronea parviglumis 
Morronea trichidiachnis

References

Panicoideae
Poaceae genera